The 1999 Winter Universiade, the XIX Winter Universiade, took place in Poprad Tatry, Slovakia.

Medal table

Sports
 Figure skating

 
1999
U
U
Winter Universiade, 1999
U
Multi-sport events in Slovakia
January 1999 sports events in Europe
Winter sports competitions in Slovakia